The 2017–18 Port Vila Premier League or 2017–18 TVL Premier League is the 24th edition of the Port Vila Premier League, the highest tier football league in Port Vila, Vanuatu. The season started on 8 September 2017.

Standings

PVFA Top Four Super League

Grand Final Qualifier

Semifinal Qualifier

Replay

Semifinal

Grand Final
Winner of the Grand Final qualifies for the 2019 OFC Champions League and the 2018 VFF National Super League grand final.

See also
2018 VFF National Super League

References

Port Vila Football League seasons
Vanuatu, Port Vila
Vanuatu, Port Vila
2017–18 in Vanuatuan football